The Baeksang Arts Award for Best Actress – Television is an award presented annually at the Baeksang Arts Awards ceremony organised by Ilgan Sports and JTBC Plus, affiliates of JoongAng Ilbo, usually in the second quarter of each year in Seoul.

Multiple wins

Winners and nominees

1970s

1980s

1990s

2000s

2010s

2020s

References

Sources

External links 
  

Baeksang Arts Awards (television)
Television awards for Best Actress
Television acting awards